Kharestan-e Pain (also Romanized as Khārestān-e Pā’īn; also known as Khārestān) is a village in Tamin Rural District, in the Central District of Mirjaveh County, Sistan and Baluchestan Province, Iran. At the 2006 census, its population was 159, in 33 families.

References 

Populated places in Mirjaveh County